Ian Graham (born 5 January 1943) is a former Australian rules footballer who played with Collingwood in the Victorian Football League (VFL) during the 1960s. 

His best season came in 1964 when he won the Copeland Trophy for Collingwood's Best and Fairest player. He finished the year by playing the Grand Final against Melbourne. In that game he kicked 1 goal, however Collingwood proceeded to lose the final by 4 points. He kicked 42 goals for the season, only bettered in 1966 when he managed 58 goals.

References

External links

1943 births
Australian rules footballers from Victoria (Australia)
Collingwood Football Club players
Copeland Trophy winners
University Blacks Football Club players
Tongala Football Club players
Living people